Preković is a Serbian surname. Notable people with the surname include:

Milan Preković (born 1973), Serbian former basketball player
Miloje Preković (born 1991), Serbian footballer

Serbian surnames
Patronymic surnames